Get On Up and Dance is the debut studio album by American group Quad City DJ's. The group was made up of Jay Ski and C.C. Lemonhead, both of whom had previously worked with Chill Deal, 95 South and 69 Boyz, and producing hits such as "Whoot, There It Is" and "Tootsee Roll" for them. Singer JeLanna “Lana” LaFleur was added to the group after being discovered dancing at the Tootsie Roll video shoot. Once recognized for her dancing abilities, she decided to show off her vocal skills in the studio and quickly was added as a member contributing all of the vocals to the album. The album contained the major hit single "C'mon N' Ride It (The Train)" which peaked at number 3 on the Billboard Hot 100 and went Platinum. Get On Up and Dance peaked at number 31 on the Billboard 200 and was certified Platinum by the Recording Industry Association of America (RIAA) for selling over a million copies in the United States.

Critical reception

Despite feeling repetitive at times and lacking tracks that match the catchability of "C'mon N' Ride It", Johnny Loftus from AllMusic said the album works best as a "harmless, humorous, and entertaining diversion" at parties, concluding that, "Hovering at an average of 132 beats per minute, Get On Up and Dance also never makes the mistake of including a ballad or an unfunny skit. It's all about dancing, all the time."

Track listing

Charts and certifications

Weekly charts

Year-end charts

Certifications

References

1996 debut albums
Big Beat Records (American record label) albums
Miami bass albums
Southern hip hop albums